Between 1634 and 2009, Finland was administered as several provinces. Finland had always been a unitary state: the provincial authorities were part of the central government's executive branch and apart from Åland, the provinces had little autonomy. There were never any elected provincial parliaments in continental Finland. The system was initially created in 1634. Its makeup was changed drastically on 1 September 1997, when the number of the provinces was reduced from twelve to six. This effectively made them purely administrative units, as linguistic and cultural boundaries no longer followed the borders of the provinces. The provinces were eventually abolished at the end of 2009. Consequently, different ministries may subdivide their areal organization differently. Besides the former provinces, the municipalities of Finland form the fundamental subdivisions of the country. In current use are the regions of Finland, a smaller subdivision where some pre-1997 läänis are split into multiple regions. Åland retains its special autonomous status and its own regional parliament.

Duties 
Each province was led by a governor (Finnish maaherra, Swedish landshövding) appointed by the president on the recommendation of the cabinet. The governor was the head of the State Provincial Office (Finnish lääninhallitus, Swedish länsstyrelse), which acted as the joint regional authority for seven ministries in the following domains:

social services and health care
education and culture
police administration
rescue services
traffic administration
competition and consumer affairs
judicial administration

The official administrative subentities under the Provincial Office authorities were the Registry Offices (Finnish maistraatti, Swedish magistrat).  Formerly there was also a division to state local districts (Finnish kihlakunta, Swedish härad), which were districts for police, prosecution, and bailiff services, but there was reorganization such that 24 police districts were founded. These usually encompass multiple municipalities.

Provinces governed only state offices, such as the police. Most services, such as healthcare and maintenance of local streets, were and remain today the responsibility of municipalities of Finland. Many municipalities are too small for a hospital and some other services, so they cooperate in municipality groups, e.g. health care districts, using borders that vary depending on the type of service. Often Swedish-language municipalities cooperate even if they do not share a border.

List of all provinces that ever existed 

In 1634, administratives provinces were formed in Sweden, and therefore in Finland, which was a part of Sweden until 1809. Five of the provinces covered what is now Finland; some of these also covered parts of what are now Russia. The exact division of the country into provinces has fluctuated over time.

The boundaries of the old provinces partly survive in telephone area codes and electoral districts. The exception is Helsinki: there is a telephone numbering area that comprises Greater Helsinki (code 09), while only the city of Helsinki proper comprises the electoral district of Helsinki, the rest of Greater Helsinki belonging to the Uusimaa electoral district.

Geographical evolution of provincial administration

Provinces of Finland at abolition 

a.  Some duties, which in Mainland Finland are handled by the provinces, are on the Åland Islands transferred to the autonomous Government of Åland.b.  The Åland Islands are unilingually Swedish.

After abolition
The provinces were abolished altogether effective 1 January 2010. Since then, the regional administration of the Finnish state has two parallel top-level organs in the hierarchy: the Centres for Economic Development, Transport and the Environment on the one hand, and the Regional State Administrative Agencies on the other.

Five Regional State Administrative Agencies (aluehallintovirasto, regionförvaltningsverk, abbr. avi) – in addition to the State Department of Åland – are primarily responsible for law enforcement. Among these, South-Western Finland and Western and Central Finland cover the former province of Western Finland, and the former province of Oulu was revamped as Northern Finland; other old provincial boundaries remain much the same in the new disposition.

In parallel, there are 15 Centres for Economic Development, Transport and the Environment (Finnish: elinkeino-, liikenne- ja ympäristökeskus, usually abbreviated ely-keskus), which are responsible for other state administration: employment, road and transport infrastructure, and environmental monitoring. They are each responsible for one or more of regions of Finland, and include offices of the Ministries of Employment and the Economy, Transport and Communications and Environment.

See also 
Historical provinces of Finland
ISO 3166-2:FI
NUTS statistical regions of Finland
Provincial Governors of Finland
Regions of Finland
Subdivisions of the Nordic countries

References

External links 
 State Provincial OfficesOfficial site

 
Lists of subdivisions of Finland
Lists of populated places in Finland
2010 disestablishments in Finland